Conus honkeri is a species of sea snail, a marine gastropod mollusk in the family Conidae, the cone snails and their allies.

Like all species within the genus Conus, these snails are predatory and venomous. They are capable of "stinging" humans, therefore live ones should be handled carefully or not at all.

Distribution
This species occurs in the Caribbean Sea off Venezuela at a depth of 35 m.

Description 
The maximum recorded shell length is 37 mm.

Habitat 
Minimum recorded depth is 35 m. Maximum recorded depth is 35 m.

References

 Petuch, E. J. Neogene History of Tropical American Mollusks: Biogeography and Evolutionary Patterns of Tropical Western Atlantic Mollusks. 158, plate 36, figure 1–2.
 Filmer R.M. (2001). A Catalogue of Nomenclature and Taxonomy in the Living Conidae 1758–1998. Backhuys Publishers, Leiden. 388pp
 Tucker J.K. & Tenorio M.J. (2009) Systematic classification of Recent and fossil conoidean gastropods. Hackenheim: Conchbooks. 296 pp.

External links
 The Conus Biodiversity website
 

honkeri
Gastropods described in 1988